Eva Dedova  (born 22 February 1992) is a Kazakhstani and Turkish actress. She was born to Kazakhstani parents of Russian-German descent. She grew up in Kazakhstan and Turkey. She studied theater at Kadir Has University in Istanbul. She speaks Turkish, Russian, Kazakh and English.

Filmography

Television
 Çok Güzel Hareketler Bunlar
 2011: Kavak Yelleri
 2012: Yalan Dünya
 2013: Mahmut ile Meryem
 2014: Kurt Seyit ve Şura
 2016: Babam ve Ailesi
 2018: Mehmetçik Kut'ül Amare
 2020: Rise of Empires: Ottoman

Commercials
DeFacto
Anadolu Hayat Sigorta 
Kent
Arabam.com

References

1992 births
Living people
People from Almaty
Kazakhstani actresses
Kazakhstani people of German descent
Kazakhstani people of Russian descent
Kadir Has University alumni
Kazakhstani emigrants to Turkey
Turkish television actresses